Michel Verleysen from the University of Louvain (UCLouvain) in Louvain-la-Neuve, Belgium was named Fellow of the Institute of Electrical and Electronics Engineers (IEEE) in 2015 for contributions to high-dimensional analysis and manifold learning.

References

Fellow Members of the IEEE
Living people
Academic staff of the Université catholique de Louvain
Year of birth missing (living people)
Place of birth missing (living people)